
Gmina Łagów is a rural gmina (administrative district) in Świebodzin County, Lubusz Voivodeship, in western Poland.

The gmina contains part of the protected area called Łagów Landscape Park.

Villages
Gmina Łagów contains the villages and settlements of Czyste, Gronów, Jemiołów, Kłodnica, Kolonia Czartów, Kosobudki, Kosobudz, Łagów, Łagówek, Niedźwiedź, Pasałka, Poźrzadło, Sieniawa, Stok, Toporów, Troszki, Zamęt and Żelechów.

Neighbouring gminas
Gmina Łagów is bordered by the gminas of Bytnica, Lubrza, Skąpe, Sulęcin and Torzym.

Twin towns – sister cities

Gmina Łagów is twinned with:
 Buckow, Germany

References

Lagow
Świebodzin County